The Raetovari (or Raetobari) were an Alamannic tribe in the region of the Nördlinger Ries in the west of the German state of Bavaria. They were mentioned by the Roman historian Ammianus Marcellinus (330–395).

Early Germanic peoples
Alemanni